Scabrotrophon puillandrei is a species of sea snail, a marine gastropod mollusk, in the family Muricidae, the murex snails or rock snails.

Distribution
This marine species occurs off Papua New Guinea.

References

puillandrei
Gastropods described in 2016